Zajíček (feminine Zajíčková) is a Czech surname meaning "small hare", a diminutive of Zajíc. Notable people with the surname include:

 Adam Zajíček (born 1993), Czech volleyball player
 Carl Wenzel Zajicek (1860–1923), Viennese painter
 Jan Zajíček (born 1977), Czech film director
 Jan Zajíček (ice hockey) (born 1951), Czech ice hockey player
 Jaroslav Zajíček (1920–2002), Czech cross-country skier
 Lubomír Zajíček (1946–2013), Czech volleyball player
 Pavel Zajíček (born 1951), Czech poet
 Phil Zajicek (born 1979), American road cyclist

Czech-language surnames